This article lists the winners and nominees for the Black Reel Award for Television for Outstanding Actress, Comedy Series. This category was first introduced in 2017 and won by Issa Rae for Insecure. Rae leads the pack with most wins with 4 (consecutively). Tracee Ellis Ross is currently the most nominated actor with 5 nominations.

Winners and nominees
Winners are listed first and highlighted in bold.

2010s

2020s

Superlatives

Programs with multiple awards

4 awards
 Insecure

Performers with multiple awards

4 awards
 Issa Rae (4 consecutive)

Programs with multiple nominations

5 nominations 
 Black-ish

4 nominations
 Insecure

3 nominations 
 Dear White People

2 nominations
 Grown-ish
 The Last O.G.

Performers with multiple nominations

5 nominations
 Tracee Ellis Ross

4 nominations 
 Issa Rae

3 nominations 
 Logan Browning

2 nominations
 Tiffany Haddish
 Yara Shahidi

Total awards by network
 HBO - 5

References

Black Reel Awards